The 1917–18 Drexel Blue and Gold men's basketball team represented Drexel Institute of Art, Science and Industry during the 1916–17 men's basketball season. The Blue and Gold played their home games at Main Building.

Roster

Schedule

|-
!colspan=9 style="background:#F8B800; color:#002663;"| Regular season
|-

References

Drexel Dragons men's basketball seasons
Drexel
1917 in sports in Pennsylvania
1918 in sports in Pennsylvania